D'Aeth is a surname. Notable people with the surname include:

D'Aeth baronets
Richard D'Aeth (1912–2008), British educationalist